The Last Ringbearer is a 1999 fantasy fan-fiction book by Russian author Kirill Eskov. It is an alternative account of, and an informal sequel to, the events of J. R. R. Tolkien's The Lord of the Rings. It has been translated into English by Yisroel Markov, but has not been printed for fear of copyright action by the Tolkien Estate. 

Critics have stated that the book is well-known to Tolkien fans in Russia, and that it certainly provides an alternate take on the story. Scholars have variously called it a parody and a paraquel. They have interpreted it as a critique of totalitarianism, or of Tolkien's anti-modern racial and environmental vision coupled with the destruction of technology, which itself could be called totalitarian.

Plot 

Eskov bases his novel on the premise that the Tolkien account is a "history written by the victors". Eskov's version of the story describes Mordor as a peaceful constitutional monarchy on the verge of an industrial revolution, that poses a threat to the war-mongering and imperialistic faction represented by Gandalf (whose attitude has been described by Saruman as "crafting the Final Solution to the Mordorian problem") and the racist Elves. 

The tale begins by recapping the War of the Ring. The  Ring itself is a luxurious ornament, but powerless, crafted by the Nazgûl (a group of ancient scientists and philosophers who take turns as the Nine to guide Mordor through its industrialization) to distract Gandalf and the Elves while Mordor built up its army. Aragorn is portrayed as a puppet of the Elves who has been instructed to usurp the throne of Gondor by murdering Boromir (whom he had discovered alone after Merry and Pippin were captured) before Gandalf removes Denethor. Arwen, being 3,000 years older, holds Aragorn in contempt but uses their marriage to cement Elvish rule over Gondor. Faramir has been exiled to Ithilien where he is kept under guard with Éowyn. The Elves have also corrupted the youth of Umbar (using New-Age style mysticism), which they aim to use as a foothold into Harad and Khand.

After defeating the Mordorian army, the Elves enter Mordor to massacre civilians with the help of Men from the East, supposedly to eliminate the "educated" classes. Two Orc soldiers ("Orc" being a slur used by the West against foreign men), the medic Haladdin and Sergeant Tzerlag, are fleeing the battle plain. They rescue Tangorn, a Gondorian noble who had been left buried in the desert for attempting to stop one of the massacres. They locate the mercenaries and kill the Elf, Eloar, taking his possessions.

The last of the Nazgûl, Sharya-Rana, visits Haladdin and explains that the physical world, Arda, is linked to the magical world from which the elves came, by the power of Galadriel's Mirror in Lórien and the palantírs. Haladdin is given the task of destroying the Mirror in order to separate the worlds and complete the goal of making men truly free. Haladdin is chosen as he is a rare individual in whom there is absolutely no magic, and has a tendency to behave irrationally, for example joining the Mordorian army as a medic to impress his girlfriend and almost dying as a result, instead of putting his talents to better use at home in the university. While the Nazgûl cannot foresee how the quest is to be completed, he is able to provide Haladdin with useful information, including the current location of the palantírs.

An elaborate plan is devised which involves the forging of a letter from Eloar by a Mordorian handwriting expert. Tangorn manages to arrange a meeting with the Elves in Umbar, while evading Gondor's efforts to eliminate him. He is eventually killed, which convinces the Elves to pass his message on to Eloar's mother, Eornis, a member of the ruling hierarchy of Lórien. She is led to believe that her son is captured rather than killed. A palantir is dropped into Lórien by a Mordorian researcher developing flight-based weapons (under the secret patronage of Aragorn), and Eornis is instructed to bring the palantír to Galadriel's Mirror. This is supposed to prove that she is in Lórien, whereupon she will be allowed to communicate with Eloar.

At the appointed time, Haladdin brings another palantír to Mount Doom. Gandalf figures out his plan and, concerned that magic will be banished from Middle-Earth, casts a remote spell on the palantír to turn its user into stone, but this has no effect. Saruman, despite opposing Gandalf's methods, believes that Sharya-Rana's hypothesis about the relationship between the magical and physical worlds is incorrect and attempts to reason with Haladdin. However, Tzerlag touches the palantír by mistake and begins to turn into stone. In a bout of irrationality, Haladdin decides to drop the palantír into Orodruin because Saruman is unable to reverse Gandalf's spell. This causes the Eternal Fire to be transmitted to the other palantírs and the Mirror, destroying them and the magic of the Elves.

Haladdin goes into self-imposed exile and Tzerlag's descendants pass on the story orally, although the historical record officially contains Aragorn's version of events. Although despised by the Gondorian aristocracy, Aragorn finds favour with the people as his policies result in an "economic miracle" and after his death, childless, the throne reverts to the "rightful" king Faramir. The Elves end their occupation of Mordor and eventually leave Middle-Earth, which enters the industrial age.

Publication status 

Though translated into several languages, the book has not had a  commercial release in English. Several English-language publishing houses have considered undertaking a translation, but each has abandoned its plans due to the potential of litigation from the Tolkien Estate, which has a history of strictly objecting to any derivative works, especially in English. In 2010, Yisroel Markov translated the book into English, with a second edition released in 2011 fixing typos and revising the prose as well as providing ebook formatted versions; his text has appeared as a free and non-commercial ebook, and Eskov has officially approved this release. Mark Le Fanu, general secretary of the Society of Authors, opined that despite being non-commercial, the book still constitutes a copyright infringement.

Reception

Popular 

The American journalist Laura Miller praises The Last Ringbearer in Salon as "a well-written, energetic adventure yarn that offers an intriguing gloss on what some critics have described as the overly simplistic morality of Tolkien's masterpiece." She notes that Markov's is the "official" translation, approved by Eskov, and more polished than earlier translations of some sections of the book. In her view, there are "still some rough edges", such as the mix of present and past tenses at the start, and what she calls the "(classically Russian) habit" of adding sections of political or military history to the narrative. Noting that the book has been called fan fiction, Miller comments that it is nothing like the teenage girl fantasy genre of "unlikely romantic pairings" of characters from the canon. She likens it instead to Alice Randall's The Wind Done Gone, a retelling of Gone with the Wind, stating that Eskov's is the better book.

Benedicte Page, writing in The Guardian, states that the book is well-known to fans in Russia, and that it is based on "the idea that Tolkien's own text is the romantic legend of the winning party in the War of the Rings, and that a closer examination of it as a historical document reveals an alternate version of the story."

Terri Schwartz, writing on MTV, describes the book's take, with a warmongering Gandalf who seeks only to "crush the scientific and technological initiative of Mordor", while a forward-thinking Sauron passes a "universal literacy law", as "certainly a different take on the story, to say the least."

Academic 

Catherine Coker describes the novel as "transparent revisionism" and "a Russian parody" which repurposes the characters' ideologies "so that the heroic epic becomes a critique of totalitarianism". In her view, with Tolkien's idealism removed, the story is changed radically, becoming "emphatically, a work in its own right".

Mark Wolf calls the work a paraquel, a narrative that runs at the same time as the original story, with a different perspective.

Greg Clinton, noting that Eskov depicts Sauron and his industrial realm of Mordor as "not 'evil', but ... working to modernize production", comments that the book sees something that he believes Tolkien missed, namely that destroying technology in favour of nature as The Lord of the Rings suggests would itself be "a totalitarian move".

David Ashford describes the novel as a "splendid counter-factual fantasy", calling it the "most entertaining" and best-known retelling of its kind, despite Tolkien's direct statement rejecting any link between Orcs and Russia: "To ask if the Orcs 'are' Communists is to me as sensible as asking if Communists are Orcs."

Robert Stuart, discussing the question of Tolkien and race, comments that Eskov's book is "effective in critiquing the anti-modern dimension of Tolkien's ideological viewpoint", but concludes that one cannot equate Orcs to any group of humans.

List of translations 

 , Fantom Print, 2003.
  (online only)
 , Fantasy, 2010. 
 , 500nuancesdegeek, 2018. 
 , Solaris, 2002. 
 , Saída de Emergência, 2008. 
 , debolsillo, 2011.

See also 
 Khraniteli

References

External links
 
 Kirill Yeskov, Why I reimagined "LOTR" from Mordor's perspective, Salon, February 23, 2011
 The Back Story to the Last Ring-bearer, by Kirill Eskov

1999 novels
Parallel literature
Parody novels
Russian fantasy novels
Works based on Middle-earth
High fantasy novels
Sequel novels
Tolkien fandom
Fan fiction works